The Portland Golf Club is a private golf club in the northwest United States, in suburban Portland, Oregon. It is located in the unincorporated Raleigh Hills area of eastern Washington County, southwest of downtown Portland and east of Beaverton.

PGC was established  in the winter of 1914, when a group of nine businessmen assembled to form a new club after leaving their respective clubs. The present site was chosen due to its relation to the Spokane, Portland and Seattle Railway's interurban railroad line with frequent passenger service to the site because automobiles and roads were few.

The PGA Championship, then a match play competition, was held at the club in 1946.

Tournaments hosted

Major championships for all tours are shown in bold.

See also
 List of sports venues in Portland, Oregon

References

External links

Oregon Golf.com – Portland Golf Club

Golf clubs and courses in Oregon
Sports venues completed in 1914
Sports venues in Portland, Oregon
Buildings and structures in Washington County, Oregon
Ryder Cup venues
1914 establishments in Oregon